Jacaena is a genus of Asian liocranid sac spiders first described by Tamerlan Thorell in 1897.

Species
 it contains eleven species:
Jacaena angoonae Dankittipakul, Tavano & Singtripop, 2013 – Thailand
Jacaena distincta Thorell, 1897 (type) – Myanmar
Jacaena erawan (Deeleman-Reinhold, 2001) – Thailand
Jacaena lunulata Dankittipakul, Tavano & Singtripop, 2013 – Thailand
Jacaena mihun Deeleman-Reinhold, 2001 – Thailand
Jacaena peculiaris Dankittipakul, Tavano & Singtripop, 2013 – Thailand
Jacaena punctata Dankittipakul, Tavano & Singtripop, 2013 – Thailand
Jacaena schwendingeri (Deeleman-Reinhold, 2001) – Thailand
Jacaena tengchongensis Zhao & Peng, 2013 – China
Jacaena thakek (Jäger, 2007) – Laos
Jacaena zhui (Zhang & Fu, 2011) – China, Thailand

References

Araneomorphae genera
Liocranidae
Spiders of Asia
Taxa named by Tamerlan Thorell